Central China Normal University (CCNU) or Huazhong Normal University, located in Luonan Subdistrict, Hongshan District in Wuhan, the capital of Hubei Province, is a comprehensive university directly under the administration of the Chinese Ministry of Education. The campus of over 2,000 Mu (330 acres) is on Guizi Hill, bordering South Lake.

Central China Normal University is one of the universities included in the Double First Class University Plan and former Project 211. It is a Chinese state Double First Class University identified by the Ministry of Education of China.

History 

The predecessor of CCNU is the combination of Huachung University, Chunghua University and the Pedagogical College of Zhongyuan University, with Huachung University as the main part. Huachung University was the largest and most influential mission university in south central China and it developed from Boone College which was founded in 1903. In 1951 Huazhong University was created after the Pedagogical College of Zhongyuan University merged with Huachung University. Then it was reorganized into Huazhong Higher Normal College in 1952 and later renamed Central China Normal College in 1953. At this time a new campus was established east of Wuchang at Mount Zhutou, a location of over 700 graves and therefore a place thought to have a lot of Yin qi. The mountain was partially leveled off and renamed Mount Guizi after a plant that was widely planted on the mountain and is known for its Yang qi. In 1985 the university was formally named Central China Normal University. Deng Xiaoping, one of the founders of Zhongyuan University, inscribed the name of the university. In 1993 the President and General Secretary of the Chinese Communist Party, Jiang Zemin, wrote an inscription for the university "Developing normal education, improving the nation’s quality".

Timeline 
Boone College
 The earliest predecessor of the school was founded in 1903 as Boone College for undergraduates (started in 1871 as Boone College).

Private Huachung University
 1924: Boone College was renamed to Huachung University
 1929: Lake College of Yueyang incorporated, Yale College of Changsha incorporated.

Public Huazhong University
 After the founding of People's Republic of China, the former private status transformed to public Huazhong University.
 December 1949: incorporated Chung Yuan Christian University College of Education.

Central China Higher Normal College
 In 1952 during national college adjustment process the original public Huachung University included private Chunghua University, Guangxi University Institute of Education, Nanchang University, South China Normal University, Central Teachers College, Hainan Teachers College established the Central Higher Normal School (Central Ecole Normale Superieure).

Central China Normal College
 In 1953 the school was renamed the Central China Normal College.
 Part of Hubei University incorporated in 1962.
 Part of the South China Institute for Nationalities, Hubei Teachers Training College, Hubei Correspondence School incorporated in 1972.

Central China Normal University
 In 1985 the school was renamed to Central China Normal University, by Deng Xiaoping  who wrote the school motto.
 2005: entered the 211 key development universities list.
 2007: received special funds from the 985 Innovative Platforms for Key Disciplines Project.

Present 

Since the 7th Five-Year Plan was implemented the teaching staff have conducted scientific research projects such as the national high-tech project 863, national "Torch Program".

The university is one of the first institutions in China to offer doctoral and postgraduate degrees as well as confer titles of professor, associate professor and doctoral supervisor. It has established undergraduate, graduate, doctoral and post-doctoral programs and set up full-time adult-education programs.

The national social science research work of CCNU ranked 10th in China and its social science research work ranked 6th for four consecutive years by the Ministry of Education.

CCNU has cooperation with more than 20 universities, colleges and research institutes in America, Germany, Russia, Ukraine, France, Italy, Britain, Japan, Switzerland, Bulgaria and Brazil.
  
Foreign experts and teachers are invited to teach at the university and faculty members have gone abroad for joint research.

Facts
 School area: 1,266,500 square meters, school building area: 896,293 square meters
 Colleges: 27
 Undergraduate programs: 68
 National key disciplines: 8, National key (cultivating) discipline: 1
 Provincial and ministerial key disciplines: 22
 National bases for Personnel Training and Scientific Research in Arts and Sciences: 3
 National Engineering Research Center: 3
 National Humanities and Social Sciences key research bases: 3
 Key laboratories supervised by the Ministry of Education: 3
 Postdoctoral research programs: 13
 First-grade disciplines for Doctor's Degree: 14, First-grade disciplines for master's degree: 33
 Ph.D. programs: 94, Master's Degree programs: 184
 Professors: 478, Associate Professors: 579, PhD Supervisors: 269
 Full-time faculty: 1,834, Faculty and staff: 4,017
 Full-time students: 30,000, Postgraduates: 10,475, International students: 1,341
 Library area: 39,689 square meters, book collections: 2,962,000

National Key Disciplines 

The Ministry of Education chose CCNU as one of the national key universities for a number of disciplines. They consist of Chinese and Foreign Political Systems, Theoretical Physics, Scientific Socialism and International Communist Movement, Education Theory, Chinese Modern and Contemporary History, Literature and Art Studies, Pesticide Science and Basic Principles of Marxism.

National Key Laboratories 
CCNU hosts two national key laboratories that are sponsored by the central government and research centers recognized among worldwide academics: Laboratory for Quark and Lepton Physics and Laboratory for Pesticide Science and Chemical Biology.

Campus organizations and activities 
There are nationality based student unions on campus. The Association of Kazakh Students is the largest one with nearly 100 members.

Campus canteens 
Students are able to have meals in any of the seven canteens with a campus ID card. CCNU has implemented electronic student IDs that also serve as debit cards. Service desks and ID card machines are in every canteen during opening hours.

Schools, departments and institutes 
College of International Cultural Exchange
School of Mathematics and Statistics
Law School of Central China Normal University
School of Urban and Environmental Science
School of Life Science	
School of Chemistry
School of Physical Science and Technology	
School of Sociology	
Institute of Political Science of Central China Normal University
School of Psychology 
School of Educational Information Technology 
School of Journalism and Communication
College of Vocational & Further Education
College of Teachers Education
School of Physical Education and Sports
College of Music
School of Public Administration
School of Information Management
Graduate School 
School of Political Communication
School of Fine Arts
School of Computer Science	
School of Chinese Language and Literature
School of Education	
School of Economy and Manage
School of History and Culture
School of Foreign Languages

International cooperation 
International partners include Oxford University, McGill University and Moscow State University. Cooperation agreements were signed in 2014 with GSI Helmholtz Centre for Heavy Ion Research, RMIT University and Macquarie University.

Rankings

Ratings
 China University Center Ranking (Top 200 China University): 10th in China 
 4icu World University Ranking: 596th (42nd in China) 
 Webometrics World University Ranking: 373rd (31st in China and 57th in Asia)
 Rating of Chinese Normal Universities: 3rd 
 China Top 100 University Ranking: 40th 
 Humanities and Social Sciences in China: 17th 
 Political Science in China: 3rd 
 Law Schools in China: 12th

Notable alumni
Yun Daiying - early leader of the Chinese Communist Party.
Song Jiaoren - republican revolutionary, political leader and a founder of the Kuomintang (KMT).
Tang Haoming- novelist. He is known for writing biographical novels of Zeng Guofan, Zhang Zhidong, and Yang Du. He is the vice president of Hunan Writers Association.
Feng Gong - actor, xiangsheng performer, film director, and screenwriter from Tianjin, China. He is the great grandson of Feng Guozhang, a statesman and warlord of China during the early 20th century.
Feng Youlan - philosopher who was instrumental for reintroducing the study of Chinese philosophy in the modern era.
Huang Kan - philologist and revolutionary.
Wu Mi - founder of Chinese comparative literature, a critic, redologist, educator and poet.
Deng Xiaoping - co-founder of the Zhongyuan University, was a Chinese revolutionary and statesman. He was the leader of China from 1978 until his retirement in 1992.
Chen Yi - co-founder of the Zhongyuan University. He served as Mayor of Shanghai from 1949 to 1958 and as Foreign Minister of China from 1958 to 1972.
Jiang Siqi - Miss China World 2021, Top 40 of Miss World 2021

Notable professors

Zhang Kaiyuan:  Former president of CCNU. He holds Honorary Doctor of Laws degrees from Augustana College, Soka University and Kansai University.

Gallery

References

External links

Central China Normal University (English)

 
Teachers colleges in China
Universities and colleges in Wuhan
1903 establishments in China